Tte. 1ro Inocencio Herebia Airport , or simply known as Fuerte Olimpo Airport, is an airport serving the Paraguay River port of Fuerte Olimpo in Alto Paraguay Department of Paraguay.

The runway was paved in 2016 and an apron added. There are large hills just southeast of the runway.

See also

 List of airports in Paraguay
 Transport in Paraguay

References

External links
 HERE Maps - Fuerte Olimpo
 OpenStreetMap - Fuerte Olimpo
 OurAirports - Fuerte Olimpo Airport

Airports in Paraguay
Fuerte Olimpo